is a Japanese manga series written and illustrated by Hideaki Yoshikawa.  The series is published by Media Factory in Japan and by Seven Seas Entertainment in the United States.

Release
Hideaki Yoshikawa began serializing the manga in the November issue of Media Factory's seinen manga magazine Monthly Comic Alive on 27 September 2014.  The series concluded in the magazine's December 2015 issue on 27 October 2015, and has been collected into four volumes.

North American publisher Seven Seas Entertainment announced its license to the series on 14 July 2015.

Volumes

Reception
Rebecca Silverman of Anime News Network gave the first volume a grade of B−.  She felt that the story was interesting, but that the volume suffered from being mostly setup.  She also felt that the series' fanservice was out of place, writing that it seemed "as if Yoshikawa felt the need to stop and give us a show before moving the plot along."  She was positive toward the sibling relationships portrayed in the story, enjoying the fact that they were platonic as opposed to "distracting us with a forbidden love angle."  She called the manga's art "serviceable without being particularly good", noting the lack of visible motion during action scenes, and commented that the series monsters were better drawn than its people.

References

External links
  at Seven Seas Entertainment
 

Media Factory manga
Seven Seas Entertainment titles
Seinen manga
Fantasy anime and manga
Action anime and manga